La Gata (English:The Cat) may refer to:

 The Cat (1947 film), a 1947 Argentine drama film
 The Cat (1956 film), a 1956 French-Spanish film
 La Gata (1968 telenovela), a Venezuelan telenovela
 La Gata (1970 telenovela), produced by Teleprogramas Acapulco (Televisa), starring Juan Ferrara
 La Gata (1992 film)
 La Gata (1977 film)
 La Gata (2014 telenovela), produced by Televisa
 La Gata (bar), a bar in Frankfurt, the world's oldest lesbian bar

See also
 Gata (disambiguation)